Julius Ernest Wilhelm Fučík (18 July 1872 – 25 September 1916) was a Czech composer and conductor of military bands. He became a prolific composer, with over 400 marches, polkas, and waltzes to his name. As most of his works were for military bands, he is sometimes known as the "Bohemian Sousa".

Today his marches are still played as patriotic music in the Czech Republic. His worldwide reputation rests primarily on two works: "The Florentiner March", popular throughout much of Europe, and the "Entrance of the Gladiators" (Vjezd gladiátorů), which is widely recognized, often under the title "Thunder and Blazes", as one of the most popular theme tunes for circus clowns.

Fučík was the brother of opera singer and bass player Karel Fučík and uncle of the journalist Julius Fučík, who was executed by the Nazis.

Biography

Fučík was born in Prague, Bohemia, on 18 July 1872 when Prague was part of the Austro-Hungarian Empire. As a student, he learned to play the bassoon with Ludwig Milde, violin with Antonín Bennewitz, and various percussion instruments, later studying composition under Antonín Dvořák.

In 1891, he joined the 49th Austro-Hungarian Regiment as a military musician. He initially played in Krems by the Danube under Josef Wagner. In 1894, he left the army to take up a position as second bassoonist at the German Theatre in Prague. A year later he became the conductor of the Danica Choir in the Croatian city of Sisak. During this time, Fučík wrote a number of chamber music pieces, mostly for clarinet and bassoon.

In 1897, he rejoined the army as the bandmaster for the 86th Infantry Regiment based in Sarajevo. Shortly after, he wrote his most famous piece, the Einzug der Gladiatoren or "Entrance of the Gladiators". Originally titled Grande Marche Chromatique, his interest in Roman history led him to rename the march as he did. In 1910, Canadian composer Louis-Phillipe Laurendeau arranged "Entrance of the Gladiators" for a small band, under the title "Thunder and Blazes." It is in this version that the piece is most familiar, universally associated with the appearance of the clowns in a circus performance.

In 1900, Fučík's band was moved to Budapest where he found there were eight regimental bands ready to play his compositions, but he also faced more competition to get noticed. Having more musicians at his disposal, Fučík began to experiment with transcriptions of orchestral works.

In 1910, Fučík moved again, returning to Bohemia where he became the bandmaster of the 92nd Infantry Regiment in Theresienstadt.  At the time, the band was one of the finest in the Austro-Hungarian Empire, and he toured with them giving concerts in Prague and Berlin to audiences of over 10,000 people.

In 1913, Fučík settled in Berlin where he started his own band, the Prager Tonkünstler-Orchester, and a music publishing company, Tempo Verlag, to market his compositions. His fortunes began to wane with the outbreak of the First World War. Under the privations of the war, his business failed and his health suffered. On 25 September 1916, Julius Fučík died in Berlin at the age of 44, likely of a heart attack.  He is buried in Vinohrady Cemetery in Prague.

Selected works

Marches
 Vjezd gladiátorů op. 68 (Entrance of the Gladiators) (1897)
 Salve Imperator op. 224 (1898)
 Danubia op. 229 (1899)
 Triglav op. 72 (1900)
 Pod admirálskou vlajkou (1901)
 Mississippi River (1902)
 Fantastický pochod (Marche fantastique) (1902)
 Triglav (1903)
 Stále vpřed (Sempre avanti) (1904)
 Stráž Slovanstva (1907)
 Florentinský pochod op. 214 (Florentiner March) (1907)
 Veselí venkovští kováři (1908)
 Hercegovac op. 235 (1908)
 Boží bojovníci (1911)
 Vítězný meč (1913)
 Zvuky fanfár (1914)
 Schneidig vor op. 79
 Vojenský (Il soldato) op. 92
 Stále kupředu op. 149
 Die Regimentskinder op. 169
 Attila op. 211
 Die Lustigen Dorfschmiede op. 218
 Uncle Teddy op. 239
 Furchtlos und Treu op. 240
 Die Siegesschwert op. 260
 Leitmeritzer Schuetzenmarsch op. 261
 Einzug der Olympischen Meisterringer op. 274
 Fanfarenklaenge op. 278
 Erinnerung an Trient op. 287
 Siegestrophaen op. 297
 Gigantic op. 311

Waltzes and polkas
 Ideály snů – waltz (1900)
 Od břehu Dunaje (Vom Donauufer) op. 135 – waltz (1903)
 Escarpolette – waltz (1906)
 Virtuoso polka for fagot Starý bručoun (1907)
 Zimní bouře (Winter Storm) op. 184 – waltz (1907)
 Dunajské pověsti – waltz (1909)
 Baletky – waltz (1909)
 Liebesflammen op. 248 (valzer)
 Tanec milionů op. 121 (waltz)

Other works
 Concertant overtures Marinarella op. 215 (1907) and Miramare (1912)
 Symphonic suite Život (Life) (1907)
 St. Hubertus op. 250 (Overture)
 Requiem op. 281
 Chamber compositions for clarinet and bassoon

References
 Baker's Biographical Dictionary of Musicians, 2001
 Biography at www.klassika.info (in German)
 Biography at www.planet-vienna.com (in German)
 Oxford Music Online

External links
 
 Midi file of the introduction to Entry of the Gladiators also known as Thunder and Blazes.
 Partial catalogue of compositions
 This version of his most famous march has words:  Big Red Noses

1872 births
1916 deaths
19th-century classical composers
19th-century Czech male musicians
19th-century Czech people
20th-century classical composers
20th-century Czech male musicians
20th-century Czech people
Czech bandleaders
Czech classical bassoonists
Czech classical musicians
Czech conductors (music)
Czech male classical composers
Czech military musicians
Czech Romantic composers
Male conductors (music)
March musicians
Musicians from Prague